Revolutionary Workers League of Sweden (in Swedish: Sveriges Revolutionära Arbetarförbund), initially known as Revolutionary Workers League (Revolutionära Arbetares Förbund), was Trotskyist organisation in Sweden. The group was formed in 1975.

SRAF was the Swedish section of the International League for the Reconstruction of the Fourth International.

SRAF published Röda Fanan. In 1976 the name of the publication was changed to Proletär Offensiv. In total around 60 issues were published 1976–1983.

SRAF was dissolved in 1983.

1975 establishments in Sweden
1983 disestablishments in Sweden
Defunct organizations based in Sweden
Organizations disestablished in 1983
Organizations established in 1975
Trotskyist organizations in Sweden